Kabara was a Palestinian Arab village in the Haifa Subdistrict. It was depopulated during the 1947–1948 Civil War in Mandatory Palestine on April 30, 1948. It was located 30 km southeast of Haifa.

History
A cave in the vicinity contains artifacts from the Middle Palaeolithic and Natufian periods.

The PEF's Survey of Western Palestine visited in 1873, and noted about  Kebarah:   "Traces of ruins exist here: a cave, and a tomb with nine kokim, and an ante-chamber and entrance of masonry, with a circular arch of small stones.  Near this ruin the wall or dam, built to prevent the spreading north- wards of the marsh surrounding the Zerka, will be found marked on the Sheet, ending in a knoll on the east. The masonry resembles that in the aqueducts at Cæsarea; the stones vary in length, averaging about 2 feet,  and are set in cement. The wall is about 4 feet thick, with two rows of ashlar, and thoroughbonds, being built in alternate headers and stretchers. The core of the wall is of rubble."

British Mandate era
Early in the mandate, a government concession was granted to the Palestine Jewish Colonization Association (PICA) to develop the area. A long-running legal dispute between the Palestinian inhabitants of the area, the Mandatory government, and PICA, continued through the period of the mandate.

In the 1922 census of Palestine conducted by the British Mandate authorities, Kabara  had a population of 73 Muslims. In the 1931 census   it was counted with Jisr az-Zarqa, together they had a population of   572 Muslims,  in  a total of 117  houses.

In 1938 the kibbutz of Ma'ayan Tzvi was established on what traditionally had been village land.

In the 1945 statistics it had a population of 120 Muslims, with a total of 9,831 dunams of which Muslims owned 1,070, Jews 3,487 and 5,247 was public land.  Of the land,  Arabs used 2 dunams for citrus and bananas, 20  for plantations and irrigable land,  for cereals, while a total of 2,437 dunams was classified as  non-cultivable land.

1948 and aftermath
According to Walid Khalidi no information is given about how the village became depopulated, but he assumes it was during the second campaign to "clear" the coastal areas of Arabs, that is, in late April, or early May, 1948. Following the war, the area was incorporated into the State of Israel; Ma'agan Michael was established in 1949 and Beit Hanania in 1950, both on village land.

In 1992 the village site was described: "The rubble from the village houses has been moved up the slope where it is now visible, covered with dirt. Cactuses and  banana trees, as well as isolated fig, carob,  and olive trees grow on the site."

References

Bibliography

External links
Welcome To Kabara
Kabara, Zochrot
A Classic Zionist Story, Meron Rapoport Jun 10, 2010, Haaretz
Survey of Western Palestine, Map 7: IAA, Wikimedia commons

Arab villages depopulated prior to the 1948 Arab–Israeli War
District of Haifa